Gerald Távara (born 25 March 1999) is a Peruvian football player who plays as midfielder for UTC Cajamarca in Peruvian Primera División on loan from Sporting Cristal.

International career
He was selected for Peru squad for the 2021 Copa América and made his debut on 12 June 2021 in a game against Brazil.

References

1999 births
Living people
Peruvian footballers
Peru youth international footballers
Peru under-20 international footballers
Peru international footballers
Peruvian Primera División players
Sporting Cristal footballers
Universidad Técnica de Cajamarca footballers
Association football midfielders
Footballers at the 2014 Summer Youth Olympics
People from Piura Region
2021 Copa América players